Ronald Turini (born 30 September 1934) is a Canadian pianist, and the first Canadian artist to win a prize at the Ferruccio Busoni International Piano Competition, the Queen Elisabeth Competition, and the Geneva International Music Competition.

Early life 
Born in Montreal, Quebec, Turini made his debut as a soloist with the Montreal Symphony Orchestra at the age of ten. At the Mannes School of Music, Turini studied with Isabelle Vengerova and Olga Stroumillo, who introduced him to Vladimir Horowitz. Horowitz, who accepted few pupils, was sufficiently impressed to take Turini on as a student. Horowitz became a major influence on Turini, who studied with Horowitz from 1957 through 1963.

Career 
In 1958, Turini was awarded second prize at the Ferrucio Busoni International Piano Competition, and along with Maurizio Pollini he was unanimously awarded a second prize at the Geneva International Music Competition.  Turini also took second place at the 1960 edition of the Queen Elisabeth Competition.  On January 23, 1961, Turini made his American debut at Carnegie Hall, playing sonatas by Schumann and Hindemith, etudes by Chopin and Scriabin, and pieces by Schumann, Chopin, Liszt, Mendelssohn, Ravel and Scarlatti. The next day, New York Times music critic Harold C. Schonberg characterized Turini as "resplendent", adding that "in addition to technical expertness, there was a quality of aristocracy to the performance." That same year, Turini performed Schumann's Piano Concerto with the Montreal Symphony Orchestra under Zubin Mehta, receiving praise for his "placid sensitivity" as well as his "passion and power".

Following his Carnegie Hall debut, Turini performed both in North America and abroad, returning to Carnegie Hall in 1964 and 1967. He made his Boston debut in 1969 for the Peabody Mason Concert series, returning in 1971.  Turini has made three tours of Russia, three tours of South America, and two tours of Japan. He has been the soloist with orchestras in North America, including the Chicago, National, Toronto and Montreal symphony orchestras, and in Europe, including the Royal Philharmonic, London Philharmonic, BBC Symphony and Leningrad Philharmonic orchestras.

Turini's 1961 Carnegie Hall recital makes up discs 10 and 11 of a 43-disc boxed set of "Great Moments at Carnegie Hall", released in 2016 by Sony Classical, the other solo piano recitals being those of Sviatoslav Richter (1960), Arthur Rubinstein (1961), Vladimir Horowitz (1965), Jorge Bolet (1974), Rudolf Serkin (1977), Lazar Berman (1979), Vladimir Feltsman (1987), Evgeny Kissin (1990), and more recently Yu Kosuge (2005), and Denis Matsuev (2007).  Gramophone, reviewing his 1965 RCA Red Seal recording "Piano Music Of Schumann, Liszt, Hindemith, Scriabin", lauded Turini as "a pianist of uncommon ability" with a "range of colour... which straightaway marks him out from so many pianists".

In 1968, Turini was nominated for a Grammy Award for Best Chamber Music Performance, for his recording of the Hindemith Sonata for Viola and Piano with Walter Trampler.

A founding member of Quartet Canada, Ronald Turini began teaching at the University of Western Ontario in London, Ontario in 1977, where he was Professor Emeritus of piano performance until 2008.

References

Sources
Biography from the Encyclopedia of Music in Canada

Ronald Turini-Past Concert Programs and Reviews  (still adding)

1934 births
Living people
Canadian classical pianists
Musicians from Montreal
Prize-winners of the Queen Elisabeth Competition
Academic staff of the University of Western Ontario
21st-century Canadian pianists